Rosianna Halse Rojas (born 15 August 1991) is a British writer, video blogger, social media manager, and online personality. Rojas is best known for working with vlogger and novelist John Green, initially as his personal assistant, later producing partner.

Regarding her work with Green, Rojas has stated, "The job is varied – books, online video, podcasts, film and television projects, our work with Partners in Health Sierra Leone, a book club – but overall what I’m most passionate about is that every person I work with understands and is enthusiastic about the potential of community to effect change."

Projects

YouTube
Rojas first created a YouTube channel in 2006, when she registered her account under the username missxrojas. On the account, she would post vlogs about Harry Potter, intellectualism and her personal school life as she studied for GCSE and A Level exams, among other topics. Her videos attracted an audience, and she developed a presence in the Nerdfighteria community. Eventually, in March 2013, Rojas became John Green's personal executive assistant. John Green, along with Hank Green, comprise the VlogBrothers, a vlogging channel from which the Nerdfighteria community was created. She also gave a TED talk at TEDx Brighton. She was one of 16 vloggers recognised by YouTube's Next program in 2012.

Rojas has been described as "a pioneering nerdfighter," by The New Yorker. In 2013, Rojas was one of six fill-in hosts for Green on the VlogBrothers channel, while Green was on paternity leave. Rojas has also served as the editorial director of Leaky News, a Harry Potter fansite.

Aside from being involved in Nerdfighteria, Rojas is a personality in YouTube's female community; Rojas identifies as a feminist. Rojas was the moderator of the Sexism on YouTube panel at VidCon 2014. In this field, Rojas has also designed "The Ladies Survey", an online survey about women and the internet. Rojas is also credited with being a writer on the humanities-related courses (world history, literature, US history) on Crash Course.

In 2017, Rojas was named a Creators for Change ambassador by YouTube.

Life's Library 
In 2018, Rojas founded the Life's Library book club with John Green. The book club read a book approximately every 6 weeks, with online discussion occurring on the Life's Library Discord. Rojas and Green alternated choosing books, with guest curators occasionally making selections. Regarding Life's Library, Rojas has stated: After the first year we’ve seen a brilliant and engaged community on the Discord, with thoughtful discussions about each of the titles and an excitement and curiosity about finding out more about the text, authors, and similar books. It’s such a positive space on the internet and I feel very lucky to be a small part of it.Life's Library was free to participate in, with paid subscription options available to receive digital or physical subscriptions, containing additional materials such as a discussion podcast, or a version of the book itself. All profits from Life's Library were donated to Partners in Health Sierra Leone to help reduce maternal mortality. The book club ended in March 2022.

Podcasts 
Rojas hosts a relationships advice podcast titled Make Out With Him with friend Lex Croucher. It is described as "A crushes, dating, friendships and kissing podcast hosted by love amateurs Lex Croucher and Rosianna Halse Rojas." It is currently on hiatus.

Rojas also produces the podcasts The Anthropocene Reviewed and Dear Hank & John, both being co-productions of Complexly and WNYC Studios. She featured as a guest host in the episode It's My Soundtrack! when Hank Green was absent.

Rojas has also been a guest on three episodes of the popular Harry Potter podcast Potterless.

Film production 
After signing a first-look producing deal with Fox 2000 and Temple Hill Entertainment, Green hired Rojas as a producing partner. Their currently unnamed production company is working with Fox 2000 to produce a film about AFC Wimbledon, a third-tier English soccer team.

Rojas is also set to executive produce the upcoming Turtles All the Way Down film alongside Green.

Personal life
Rojas attended Tiffin Girls' School, prior to her enrolment at the University of Exeter where she studied English with Study in North America. Rojas attended Vassar College as an exchange student for the second year of this course.

References

1991 births
Alumni of the University of Exeter
English expatriates in the United States
English feminist writers
English literary critics
Living people
People educated at the Tiffin Girls' School
Women literary critics
Women video bloggers
YouTubers from London